Mount Wyatt Earp is a mainly snow-covered peak, 2,370 m, standing 3 nautical miles (6 km) west-northwest of Mount Ulmer in the north part of Sentinel Range, Antarctica. It is connected to Matsch Ridge and Mount Ulmer by Skamni Saddle.

The mountain was discovered by Lincoln Ellsworth on his trans-Antarctic flight of November 23, 1935. Named by the US-ACAN for the ship Wyatt Earp, used by Ellsworth in four expeditions to Antarctica between 1933 and 1939.

Further reading
  M.J. Hambrey, P.F. Barker, P.J. Barrett, V. Bowman, B. Davies, J.L. Smellie, M. Tranter, editors, Antarctic Palaeoenvironments and Earth-Surface Processes, PP 89–90
  David J. Cantrill, Imogen Poole, The Vegetation of Antarctica through Geological Time, PP 38–39
  Damien Gildea, Mountaineering in Antarctica: complete guide: Travel guide
  International Symposium on Antarctic Earth Sciences (1987), Geological Evolution of Antarctica, Cambridge, England, PP 195–197

References

Ellsworth Mountains
Mountains of Ellsworth Land